The 2018–19 Chattanooga Mocs basketball team represented the University of Tennessee at Chattanooga during the 2018–19 NCAA Division I men's basketball season. The Mocs, led by second-year head coach Lamont Paris, played their home games at McKenzie Arena and as members of the Southern Conference.

Previous season
The Mocs finished the 2017–18 season 10–23, 3–15 in SoCon play to finish for ninth place. In the SoCon tournament, they lost to East Tennessee State in the quarterfinals.

Roster

Schedule and results

|-
!colspan=9 style=| Exhibition

|-
!colspan=9 style=| Regular season

|-
!colspan=9 style=| SoCon tournament

See also
 2018-19 Chattanooga Mocs women's basketball

References

Chattanooga Mocs men's basketball seasons
Chattanooga
Chattanooga Mocs
Chattanooga Mocs